Victoria—The Lakes is a provincial electoral district in  Nova Scotia, Canada, that elects one member of the Nova Scotia House of Assembly.

Its Member of the Legislative Assembly (MLA) since the 2017 election has been Keith Bain of the Progressive Conservative Party of Nova Scotia.

It was created in 1867 as Victoria, composing all of Victoria County. In 1993, the district gained the area north of the southern border of the Cape Breton Highlands National Park. In 2003, Victoria was renamed Victoria-The Lakes. It lost the top of Inverness County to Inverness and gained some of the rural areas of Cape Breton The Lakes.

Geography

Members of the Legislative Assembly
This riding has elected the following Members of the Legislative Assembly:

Election results

2013 general election

|-
 
|Liberal Party of Nova Scotia
|Pam Eyking
|align="right"| 3,150
|align="right"| 38.99
|align="right"| +8.39
|-
 
|Progressive Conservative
|Keith Bain
|align="right"| 2,847
|align="right"| 35.24
|align="right"| -3.44
|-
 
|New Democratic Party
| John Frank Tomey
|align="right"| 1,907
|align="right"| 23.60
|align="right"| -3.28
|-

| Independent 
| Stewart M. (Stemer) MacLeod
|align="right"| 176
|align="right"| 2.18
|align="right"| +0.28
|}

2017 general election

2021 general election

References

External links
CBC riding profile (2003)

Nova Scotia provincial electoral districts